Joshua Car (born 1 August 2000) is an Australian race car driver with residence in Dallas, Texas, United States.

Career
Joshua began his racing career in karting in 2013. In 2018 he made his debut in the Formula 4 United States Championship with Crosslink Racing w/ Kiwi Motorsport. He returned to the series in 2019, and won the championship.

Racing record

Career summary

* Season still in progress.

References

External links
  

2000 births
Living people
Racing drivers from Sydney

Formula Regional Americas Championship drivers
United States F4 Championship drivers